{{Speciesbox
|name = Showy bossiaea
|image = Bossiaea cinerea.jpg
|image_caption = Bossiaea cinerea in the Grampians
|genus = Bossiaea
|species = cinerea
|authority = R.Br.
|range_map=BossiaeacinereaDistMap35.png
|range_map_caption= Occurrence data from AVH
|synonyms_ref = 
|synonyms =
 Bossiaea cinerea R.Br. var. cinerea 
 Bossiaea cinerea var. tenuicaulis' (Graham) J.M.Black 
 Bossiaea cordifolia' Sweet 
 Bossiaea tenuicaulis' Graham
}}Bossiaea cinerea, commonly known as showy bossiaea, is a species of flowering plant in the family Fabaceae and is endemic to south-eastern Australia. It is an erect or spreading shrub with trowel-shaped, triangular, egg-shaped or lance-shaped leaves with a sharply-pointed tip and golden yellow and red to purplish-brown flowers.

The wings are yellow to orange with red or brownish-purple streaks and more than twice as long as the sepals, the wings  and keel are shorter than the standard petal and brownish-purple or red.

TaxonomyBossiaea cinerea was first formally described in 1812 by Robert Brown in William Aiton's Hortus Kewensis. The specific epithet (cinerea'') means "ash-covered" or "grey".

Distribution and habitat
Showy bossiaea grows in forest, woodland, coastal heath and scrub, south from Bega in New South Wales, through southern Victoria to far south-eastern South Australia. It is common and widespread in Tasmania.

Use in horticulture
This bossiaea grows best in well drained soils but tolerates salty winds and dry conditions. It can be grown in full sun but prefers partial shade.

Gallery

References

cinerea
Mirbelioids
Flora of New South Wales
Flora of South Australia
Flora of Tasmania
Flora of Victoria (Australia)
Taxa named by Robert Brown (botanist, born 1773)